Neveh Shalom is a congregation and synagogue affiliated with Conservative Judaism, located in Portland, Oregon, United States. Founded in 1961 from the mergers of three older congregations, it has a membership of over 800 households. The early members of the synagogue were immigrants from Prussia or Poland. Resulting in the nickname "Polisha shul." Despite the synagogue's nickname, it leaned toward the German styles of Judaism, rather than the Polish one. Neveh Shalom is the second oldest Jewish congregation in the Pacific Northwest and the oldest Conservative congregation on the West Coast.

History

Neveh Shalom came from two other synagogues. Neveh Zedek and Ahavi Shalom. Ahavi Shalom was led for three years by Rabbi Julius Eckman. During these early years Jews of Prussian and Polish ethnicity were the primary demographic of the synagogue. Ahavi was known as the Polisha Shul. After Eckman left a Hazzan named Robert Abrahamson served as both the hazzan and the Rabbi due to difficulties in finding a new one. By 1889 Ahavi Shalom began conducting sermons in English instead of German. The synagogues Talmund Torah and Neveh Zedek merged in 1902, creating the modern Neveh Zedek. As the synagogue grew the need for new buildings to fit the growing congregation size arose, resulting in the construction of two buildings in 1904, 1911, and 1950. Throughout the 1920's Neveh Zedek struggled to find a Rabbi, relying on its cantor Abraham Rosencrantz, who served until 1936, the same year he died. During this period, in 1921, Neveh Zedek joined the Conservative movement. Two years later an arson set fire to the synagogue. After World War 2 an influx of Jewish refugees due to the Holocaust resulted in Neveh Zedek's teachings shifting into a more traditional style. In 1953 a new Rabbi named Joshua Stampfer arrived at the synagogue. Joshua Stampfer created a Jewish preschool which would later turn into a Foundation School. A year later, in 1954, a non-Jew named Major Pruitt would come to the synagogue to learn everything he could about Judaism. While at the synagogue he organized weddings and bar mitzvahs, kept track of yahrzeits, and he would oversee the synagogue's kosher kitchen. In 1961 Neveh Zedek merged with Ahvahai Shalom to form Neveh Shalom. In 1965 the religious schools run by the synagogue grew. They taught classes on modern and traditional Judaism and they discussed issues from a Jewish perspective. The Rabbi would also lead book discussions. Chaim Potok, Robert Kennedy, and Abraham Joshua Heschel were all hosted as speakers at the congregation in the 1960s. Kennedy would speak in 1968 during his presidential campaign. Min Zidell was the first woman to serve as a member of the board. She became a member in 1967. The first female executive director of the synagogue, Carolyn Weinstein, became so in 1976. 1967 was also the year women officially became equal to men within the law of the synagogue. By 2009 it was the largest Conservative synagogue located in Oregon.

List of Rabbis

References

Further reading 
Miranda, Gary. Following A River:  Portland's Congregation Neveh Shalom, 1869-1989. Jewish Historical Society of Oregon, 1989.

Jews and Judaism in Portland, Oregon
Religious buildings and structures in Portland, Oregon
Conservative synagogues in Oregon
1961 establishments in Oregon
Southwest Portland, Oregon
Religious organizations established in 1869
Religious organizations established in 1883
Jewish organizations established in 1900
Jewish organizations established in 1902
Jewish organizations established in 1961
Synagogues completed in 1965